WWFE (670 AM), known as "La Poderosa", is a commercial radio station in Miami, Florida, broadcasting to the Miami-Fort Lauderdale area.  WWFE has a Spanish language talk radio format, with an emphasis on Cuban news and music.  The radio studios and offices are on SW 27th Avenue in Miami.

By day, WWFE is powered at 50,000 watts, the maximum for commercial AM stations.  Because 670 AM is a United States clear channel frequency, WWFE must reduce nighttime power to 1,000 watts to prevent interference to the skywave signal of WSCR in Chicago, which is the principal Class A station on 670 AM.  (The other Class A station on this frequency is KDLG in Dillingham, Alaska.)  

WWFE broadcasts from a directional antenna at all times, with a six-tower array used at night.

In , WWFE signed on the air.

In 2022, WWFE was purchased by Salem Media Group along with WWFE’s FM translator W276DV (103.1), WRHC-AM (1550) and its FM translator W254DV (98.7).

References

External links
WWFE official website

Cuban-American culture in Miami
Hispanic and Latino American culture in Miami
WFE
WFE